United Kyrgyzstan is a nationalist political party in Kyrgyzstan founded in 2010. It is generally more popular in the south of the country. The party is led by Adakhan Madumarov, who unsuccessfully ran for president of Kyrgyzstan in 2011 and 2017, coming second and third, respectively. It holds an ethnic nationalist ideology and supports a presidential system of government. The party was originally created to support Kyrgyz migrant laborers in Russia. The party won its first seats in the Supreme Council in the October 2020 parliamentary election, which was subsequently annulled. The party passed the 3% threshold in the 2021 parliamentary election and therefore is represented in the national legislature.

History
Initially, the political party was created to support Kyrgyz migrant workers in Russia. United Kyrgyzstan won its first seats in parliament in the 2020 elections, which, however, the party itself did not recognize, and after the protests, the voting results were declared invalid. After the elections, United Kyrgyzstan entered the Coordinating Council of the Opposition of Kyrgyzstan.

Notable members 
 Jenish Moldokmatov
 Former Deputy Interior Minister Melis Turganbaye
 Almurza Satybalidiev

References

External links
Official website

Political parties established in 2006
Political parties in Kyrgyzstan
Nationalist parties in Asia
2010 establishments in Kyrgyzstan